Barnett Frank (born March 31, 1940) is a former American politician. He served as a member of the U.S. House of Representatives from Massachusetts from 1981 to 2013. A Democrat, Frank served as chairman of the House Financial Services Committee from 2007 to 2011 and was a leading co-sponsor of the 2010 Dodd–Frank Act. Frank, a resident of Newton, Massachusetts, was considered the most prominent gay politician in the United States during his time in Congress.

Born and raised in Bayonne, New Jersey, Frank graduated from Bayonne High School, Harvard College and Harvard Law School. He worked as a political aide before winning election to the Massachusetts House of Representatives in 1972. He was elected to the U.S. House of Representatives in 1980 with 52 percent of the vote. He was re-elected every term thereafter by wide margins. In 1987, he publicly came out as gay, becoming the first member of Congress to do so voluntarily. From 2003 until his retirement, Frank was the leading Democrat on the House Financial Services Committee, and he served as committee chairman when his party held a House majority from 2007 to 2011. In July 2012, he married his long-time partner, James Ready, becoming the first member of Congress to marry someone of the same sex while in office. Frank did not seek re-election in 2012, and was succeeded by fellow Democrat Joe Kennedy III. Frank's autobiography, A Life in Politics from the Great Society to Same-Sex Marriage, was published in 2015.

Prior to his time in the House of Representatives, Frank served in the Massachusetts House of Representatives from 1973 to 1981.

Early life, education, and early career
Frank was born in Bayonne, New Jersey, one of four children of Elsie (née Golush) and Samuel Frank. His family was Jewish, and his grandparents had emigrated from Poland and Russia. Frank's father ran a truck stop in Jersey City—a place Frank has described as "totally corrupt"—and when Frank was 6 or 7, his father served a year in prison for refusing to testify to a grand jury against Frank's uncle.  Frank was educated at Bayonne High School, before matriculating at Harvard College, where he resided in Matthews Hall his first year and then in Kirkland House and Winthrop House. He graduated in 1962.

Frank's undergraduate studies were interrupted by the death of his father, and Frank took a year off to help resolve the family's affairs prior to his graduation. In 1964, he was a volunteer in Mississippi during Freedom Summer. He taught undergraduates at Harvard while studying for a PhD in Government, but left in 1968 before completing the degree, to become Boston mayor Kevin White's Chief Assistant, a position he held for three years. He then served for a year as Administrative Assistant to Congressman Michael J. Harrington. In 1977, Frank graduated from Harvard Law School, where he was once a student of Henry Kissinger, while serving as a Massachusetts state representative.

Pre-congressional career
In 1972, Frank was elected to the Massachusetts House of Representatives where he served for eight years.

 He made a name for himself in the mid-1970s as a political defender of the Combat Zone, Boston's notorious red light district. Neighborhoods in Frank's district bordered the Combat Zone. As a means of dealing with crime in the area (including violence, police corruption and the infiltration by organized crime), he introduced a bill into the Massachusetts General Court that would have legalized the sex-for-hire business but kept it quarantined in a red light district, which would have been moved to Boston's Financial District. The bill, which had the support of Boston's Police Commissioner, never came up for a vote. Later, when Frank was running for Congress, opponents erroneously portrayed him as having attempted to permit red-light districts in all Bay State communities.

In 1979, Frank was admitted to the bar in Massachusetts. While in state and local government, he taught, part-time, at the University of Massachusetts Boston, the John F. Kennedy School of Government at Harvard, and at Boston University. He published numerous articles on politics and public affairs; in 1992, he published Speaking Frankly, an essay on the role the Democratic Party should play in the 1990s.

U.S. House of Representatives

Elections
In 1980, Frank ran for the U.S. House of Representatives in the 4th congressional district, hoping to succeed Reverend Robert Drinan, who had left Congress, following a call by Pope John Paul II for priests to withdraw from political positions. In the Democratic primary held on September 16, 1980, Frank won 52% of the vote in a four-candidate field. As the Democratic nominee, he faced Republican Richard A. Jones in the general election and won narrowly, 52–48%.

For his first term, Frank represented a district in the western and southern suburbs of Boston, anchored by Brookline and his hometown of Newton. However, in 1982, redistricting forced him to run against Republican Margaret Heckler, who represented a district centered on the South Coast, including Fall River and New Bedford. Although the newly configured district retained Frank's district number—the 4th—it was geographically more Heckler's district. Frank focused on Heckler's initial support for President Ronald Reagan's tax cuts, and won with 60% of the vote.

Frank did not face another serious race again for a quarter-century. From 1984 to 2008, he won re-election 12 times with at least 67% of the vote. In 1994, 1998, 2002, 2006, Frank won with more than an overwhelming 97% of the vote, with no challenge from a major political party.

In 2010, Frank ran for his 16th term. Public opinion polling showed him facing his first credible challenge since defeating Heckler in 1982. His opponent was Republican Sean Bielat, a U.S. Marine veteran and businessman. In mid-September, an internal poll showed Frank leading 48–38%. In late October, he loaned his campaign $200,000. In early October, The Cook Political Report changed its assessment of the district from "solid Democratic" to "likely Democratic"—meaning that while Frank was favored, a victory by Bielat could not be entirely ruled out. While Frank had a 3-to-1 advantage in terms of cash on hand, Bielat outraised him in September. On October 25, a survey by The Boston Globe showed Frank leading 46–33%. Frank won re-election to his 16th term, 54–43%.

On November 28, 2011, Frank announced at a news conference that he would not seek re-election in 2012.

Tenure

Scandal

In 1985, Frank was still publicly closeted. That year he hired Steve Gobie, a male prostitute, for sex, and they became "more friends than sexual partners." Frank housed Gobie and hired him with personal funds as an aide, housekeeper and driver and paid for his attorney and court-ordered psychiatrist.

In 1987, Frank evicted Gobie after being advised by his landlord that Gobie kept escorting despite the support and was doing so in the residence. Later that year, Gobie's friends persuaded him that he had a gay male version of Mayflower Madam, a TV movie about an escort service. In 1989, Gobie tried to initiate a bidding war for the story between WUSA-TV (Channel 9), The Washington Times, and The Washington Post. He then gave the story to The Washington Times for nothing, in hopes of getting a book contract.

Amid calls for an investigation, Frank asked the House Ethics Committee to investigate his relationship "in order to ensure that the public record is clear." The Committee found no evidence that Frank had known of or been involved in the alleged illegal activity and dismissed all Gobie's more scandalous claims; they recommended a reprimand for Frank using his congressional office to fix 33 of Gobie's parking tickets and for misstatements of fact in a memorandum relating to Gobie's criminal probation record. The House voted 408–18 to reprimand Frank.

The attempts to censure and expel Frank were led by Republican Larry Craig (whom Frank later criticized for hypocrisy after Craig's own arrest in 2007 for "propositioning an undercover cop in a Minneapolis-St. Paul airport bathroom"). Despite the controversy, Frank won re-election in 1990 with 66 percent of the vote, and by larger margins until the 2010 mid-term elections when his victory margin went down to eleven points.

In 2003, a documentary film about Barney Frank entitled Let's Get Frank, directed by award-winning New York photographer and filmmaker Bart Everly, and executive produced by Jonathan Van Meter, the founding Editor-in-Chief of Vibe magazine, created by Quincy Jones, and contributing editor of American Vogue and regular contributor to The New York Times Magazine, was released.  Ruth Rachel Anderson-Avraham (née Yvonne Michele Anderson) — financial lawyer, filmmaker, writer, artist, and fellow graduate of Harvard Law School, who had previously worked for Emmy Award-winning and Oscar-nominated filmmakers Rory Kennedy and Liz Garbus — co-produced the film.  This documentary not only recounted Barney Frank's own struggle coming out in public and political life as a prominent gay man, the height of which was his reprimand following the Gobie scandal, but also documented Frank's dedicated defense of U.S. President Bill Clinton during his impeachment trial in January and February 1999. At the time of its release, Let's Get Frank received mixed reviews, some celebrating the film, as Ken Eisner did in Variety, and others struggling with Everly's distinct style and the dual telling of Frank's own personal story along with that of the Clinton Impeachment Trial through Frank's eyes, as Ed Halter did in the Village Voice.  In 2006, the film was broadcast on television by Logo TV and acquired by First Run Features. Let's Get Frank has since become a part of the collections of the US Library of Congress (LOC) and the British Film Institute (BFI).

Public image
Frank is known for his quick wit and rapid-fire speaking style. In one quip, he said he was unable to complete his review of the Starr Report detailing President Bill Clinton's relationship with Monica Lewinsky, complaining that it was "too much reading about heterosexual sex". In 2004 and again in 2006, a survey of Capitol Hill staffers published in Washingtonian gave Frank the title of the "brainiest", "funniest", and "most eloquent" member of the House. In 2008, the same survey named him "brainiest", and runner up for "workhorse", and "most eloquent"; in 2010, he was named "brainiest", "workhorse", and "funniest". He is also widely considered to have been, during his tenure, one of the most powerful members of Congress. Democratic speech writer Josh Gottheimer, in his book Ripples of Hope: Great American Civil Rights Speeches, describes Frank as "one of the brightest and most energetic defenders of civil rights issues."

Fannie Mae and Freddie Mac
Frank was criticized by conservative organizations for campaign contributions totaling $42,350 between 1989 and 2008. Bill Sammon, the Washington managing editor for Fox News Channel, claimed the donations from Fannie and Freddie influenced his support of their lending programs, and said that Frank did not play a strong enough role in reforming the institutions in the years leading up to the economic crisis of 2008. In 2006, a Fannie Mae representative stated in SEC filings that they "did not participate in large amounts of these non-traditional mortgages in 2004 and 2005." In response to criticism, Frank said, "In 2004, it was Bush who started to push Fannie and Freddie into subprime mortgages, because they were boasting about how they were expanding homeownership for low-income people. And I said at the time, 'Hey—(a) this is going to jeopardize their profitability, but (b) it's going to put people in homes they can't afford, and they're gonna lose them.'"

In 2009 Frank responded to what he called "wholly inaccurate efforts by Republicans to blame Democrats, and [me] in particular" for the subprime mortgage crisis, which is linked to the financial crisis of 2007–2009. He outlined his efforts to reform these institutions and add regulations, but met resistance from Republicans, with the main exception being a bill with Republican Mike Oxley that died because of opposition from President Bush. The 2005 bill included Frank objectives, which were to impose tighter regulation of Fannie and Freddie and new funds for rental housing. Frank and Mike Oxley achieved broad bipartisan support for the bill in the Financial Services Committee, and it passed the House. But the Senate never voted on the measure, in part because President Bush was likely to veto it. "If it had passed, that would have been one of the ways we could have reined in the bowling ball going downhill called housing," Oxley told Frank. In an op-ed piece in The Wall Street Journal, Lawrence B. Lindsey, a former economic adviser to President George W. Bush, wrote that Frank "is the only politician I know who has argued that we needed tighter rules that intentionally produce fewer homeowners and more renters." Once control shifted to the Democrats, Frank was able to help guide both the Federal Housing Reform Act (H.R. 1427) and the Mortgage Reform and Anti-Predatory Lending Act (H.R. 3915) to passage in 2007. Frank also said that the Republican-led Gramm–Leach–Bliley Act of 1999, which repealed part of the Glass–Steagall Act of 1933 and removed the wall between commercial and investment banks, contributed to the financial meltdown. Frank stated further that "during twelve years of Republican rule no reform was adopted regarding Fannie Mae and Freddie Mac. In 2007, a few months after I became the Chairman, the House passed a strong reform bill; we sought to get the [Bush] administration's approval to include it in the economic stimulus legislation in January 2008; and finally got it passed and onto President Bush's desk in July 2008. Moreover, "we were able to adopt it in nineteen months, and we could have done it much quicker if the [Bush] administration had cooperated."

Subprime Mortgage crisis

As former chairman of the House Financial Services Committee, beginning in 2007, Frank was "at the center of power". Frank has been a critic of aspects of the Federal Reserve system, partnering with some Republicans in opposition to some policies. Frank says that he and Republican Congressman Ron Paul "first bonded because we were both conspicuous nonworshipers at the Temple of the Fed and of the High Priest Alan Greenspan."

Frank has been involved in mortgage foreclosure bailout issues. In 2008 Frank supported passage of the American Housing Rescue & Foreclosure Prevention Act, intended to protect thousands of homeowners from foreclosure. This law, is considered one of the most important and complex issues on which he worked. In an August 2007 op-ed piece in Financial Times, Frank wrote, "In the debate between those who believe in essentially unregulated markets and others who hold that reasonable regulation diminishes market excesses without inhibiting their basic function, the subprime situation unfortunately provides ammunition for the latter view." In 2007. Frank co-sponsored legislation to reform the Section 202 refinancing program, which is for affordable housing for the elderly, and Section 811 disabled programs. Frank has been a chief advocate of the National Housing Trust Fund, which was created as part of the Housing and Economic Recovery Act of 2008 and was the first affordable housing program to be enacted by the Congress since 1990.

During the subprime mortgage crisis, Frank was characterized as "a key deal-maker, an unlikely bridge between his party's left-wing base and ... free market conservatives" in the Bush administration. Hank Paulson, the U.S. Treasury Secretary for the Bush administration, said he enjoyed Frank's penchant for brokering deals, "he is looking to get things done and make a difference, he focuses on areas of agreement and tries to build on those."

The New York Times noted that the Federal Housing Administration's crucial role in the nation's housing market, providing low-down-payment mortgages during the crisis of 2007–2010 when no mortgages would otherwise have been available, "helped avert full-scale disaster" by helping people purchase or refinance homes and thereby putting a floor under falling home prices. However, due to the tighter flow of credit from the banks, total FHA loans in 2009 were four times that of 2006, raising concern that year that if the economy were to dip back into recession, more Fed funds could be required to keep those loans afloat. Frank's response was that the additional defaults—2.2% more of the total portfolio in 2009 than the year before—were worth the economic stabilization of the broader policy, noting "It was an effort to keep prices from falling too fast." In that context, he opined, "I don't think it's a bad thing that the bad loans occurred." In fact, the unprecedented number of loans made since 2008 were noted to be performing far better than those in the prior two years.

Political positions and votes

Abortion
In 2009 Frank had a 100% rating from NARAL Pro-Choice America, indicating a pro-choice voting record. He voted against the Partial-Birth Abortion Ban Act, against the Unborn Victims of Violence Act and against restrictions on the transportation of minors across state lines by non-family members to circumvent local abortion laws. In 1993 Frank co-sponsored the "Freedom of Choice Act" (H.R.25) (1993-H25) to "protect the reproductive rights of women". In 2006, he co-sponsored the "Compassionate Assistance for Rape Emergencies Act" (S.3945) (06-S3945), a bill for "emergency contraception for rape victims". In 2007 he co-sponsored the "Compassionate Care for Servicewomen Act" (S.1800 & HR.2064) (07-HR2064) to "providing emergency contraception at military facilities"; the "Prevention First Act" (S.21&H.R.463 2009-S21) to "expand access to preventive health care services that help reduce unintended pregnancy, reduce abortions, and improve access to women's health care".

Civil rights
In 1987, Frank was the Chair of the House Judiciary Subcommittee on Administrative Law and Governmental Relations in the 100th Congress.  In this position, he was one of the staunchest supporters of redress and reparations for Japanese American internment during World War II. In 2001, Frank co-sponsored an amendment to the U.S. Constitution to apply equal rights based on gender differences. In 2002 he co-sponsored the "Federal Agency Protection of Privacy Act" (H.R.4561) to require a "Privacy Impact Statement" on new federal rules. In 2002 he was scored at 93% by the American Civil Liberties Union on civil rights issues indicating a pro-civil rights voting record.

In 2006, Frank was one of three Representatives to oppose the Respect for America's Fallen Heroes Act, which restricted protests (notably those of Fred Phelps' Westboro Baptist Church) at soldiers' funerals. He opposed the bill, which passed unanimously in the Senate, on civil liberties and constitutional grounds. Frank said of the vote, "I think it's very likely to be found unconstitutional.  It's true that when you defend civil liberties you are typically defending people who do obnoxious things ... You play into their hand when you let them provoke you into overdoing it. I don't want these thugs to [make the] claim [that] America is hypocritical." The National Association for the Advancement of Colored People scored him at 100% in 2006 indicating a pro-affirmative-action stance.

In 2007, Frank co-sponsored the "Partnership Benefits and Obligations Act" (S.2521/H.R.4838) to "provide benefits to domestic partners of Federal employees". That same year, he co-sponsored the "Equal Rights Amendment" (S.J.RES.10/H.J.RES.40) to "strengthen the ongoing efforts of women across the country to obtain equal treatment." In 2009, he signed bills recognizing the 40th anniversary of the Stonewall Riots and the 100th anniversary of the NAACP.

Frank has been outspoken on many civil rights issues, including lesbian, gay, bisexual and transgender (LGBT) rights. In 1987, he publicly came out as gay. In 1990, Frank was instrumental in crafting the 1990 Immigration Act, which restated the reasons for which a person could be denied entry into the country.  The act did not include "sexual preference exclusion[s]", reforming earlier immigration law which allowed persons to be excluded for a sexual deviance "afflict[ion]". He said in a 1996 interview: "I'm used to being in the minority. I'm a left-handed gay Jew. I've never felt, automatically, a member of any majority." In 1995, then-Republican House Majority Leader Dick Armey famously referred to Frank as "Barney Fag" in a press interview. Armey apologized and said it was "a slip of the tongue". Frank did not accept Armey's explanation, saying "I turned to my own expert, my mother, who reports that in 59 years of marriage, no one ever introduced her as Elsie Fag." In 1998, Frank founded the National Stonewall Democrats, the national LGBT Democratic organization.

In 2006, Frank and incoming House Speaker Nancy Pelosi were accused by Rep. John Hostettler (R-IN) of having a "radical homosexual agenda"; Frank responded "I do have things I would like to see adopted on behalf of LGBT people: they include the right to marry the individual of our choice; the right to serve in the military to defend our country; and the right to a job based solely on our own qualifications. I acknowledge that this is an agenda, but I do not think that any self-respecting radical in history would have considered advocating people's rights to get married, join the army, and earn a living as a terribly inspiring revolutionary platform." Frank's stance on outing gay Republicans has been called the "Frank Rule" whereby a closeted person who uses her or his power, position, or notoriety to hurt LGBT people can be outed. The issue became relevant during the Mark Foley scandal of 2006, during which Frank clarified his position on HBO's Real Time with Bill Maher: "I think there's a right to privacy. But the right to privacy should not be a right to hypocrisy. And people who want to demonize other people shouldn't then be able to go home and close the door and do it themselves."

In February 2009, Frank was one of three openly gay members of Congress, along with Tammy Baldwin of Wisconsin and Jared Polis of Colorado. In April 2009, Frank was named in the LGBT magazine Outs "Annual Power 50 List", landing at the top spot.

In 2006 the Human Rights Campaign scored him at 100% indicating a pro-gay-rights stance.

Crime
In 2000, Frank was rated at 89% by Citizens United for Rehabilitation of Errants, indicating pro-rehabilitation crime votes. He co-sponsored "Innocence Protection Act of 2001" (H.R. 912, S.486) to "reduce the risk that innocent persons may be executed [by examining DNA evidence more thoroughly]" and the "National Death Penalty Moratorium Act of 2001" (H.R.1038, S.233) to limit capital punishment until the National Commission on the Death Penalty reviewed the "fairness of the imposition of the death penalty". In 2001, he also co-sponsored the "Local Law Enforcement Hate Crimes Prevention Act" (01-HR1343) to "provide Federal assistance to States and local jurisdictions to prosecute hate crimes." Frank co-sponsored the "Recidivism Reduction and Second Chance Act of 2007" to reduce recidivism. (this became Public Law No: 110-199).

Drugs
In 2001, Frank authored the States' Rights to Medical Marijuana Act (H.R. 2592), an attempt to stop the federal government from preempting state medical marijuana laws. He consistently voted for the bipartisan Hinchey–Rohrabacher amendment, annually proposed by Maurice Hinchey (D-NY) and Dana Rohrabacher (R-CA), to prohibit the Justice Department from prosecuting individuals complying with state medical cannabis laws. In March 2008, he proposed the Personal Use of Marijuana by Responsible Adults Act of 2008 (HR 5843), which would have legalized at the federal level small amounts of the drug, but which died in committee during the 110th Congress.  On June 18, 2009, he re-introduced the bill as the Personal Use of Marijuana by Responsible Adults Act of 2009 (HR 2943). On June 23, 2011, Frank introduced the Ending Federal Marijuana Prohibition Act to remove marijuana from the Controlled Substances Act. Commenting on legislation to remove federal criminal penalties for possession of small amounts of marijuana for personal use, Frank stated "In a free society a large degree of human activity is none of the government's business. We should make criminal what's going to hurt other people and other than that we should leave it to people to make their own choices." In 2003, he was rated "A" by Vote Hemp, indicating a pro-hemp voting record. In 2006 he was rated "+30" by NORML, indicating a pro-drug-reform stance. In 2007 he co-sponsored the "Drug Sentencing Reform & Kingpin Trafficking Act" ((S.1711) 07-S1711) to "target cocaine kingpins and address sentencing disparity between crack and powder cocaine". In 2008, Frank sponsored "Removing Impediments to Students Education" (RISE) ((H.R.5157) 08-HR5157) to allow rehabilitated drug offenders to get student loans.

In 2009 Frank signed the "Community AIDS and Hepatitis Prevention Act" (HR 179 2009-H179) to "use Federal funds for syringe exchange programs for purposes of reducing the transmission of bloodborne pathogens, including HIV and viral hepatitis" and the Industrial Hemp Farming Act of 2009 (H.R.1866 2009-H1866) to "grant each state regulating authority for the growing and processing of industrial hemp."

Economic issues
Frank was a member of the Congressional Internet Caucus established in 1996 to "promoting growth and advancement of the Internet and advance the United States' world leadership in the digital world". In 2001, he co-sponsored the "Anti-Spamming Act" (01-HR718) to protect people and businesses from "unsolicited and unwanted electronic mail".
In 2006, Frank voted for the "Communications, Opportunity, Promotion, and Enhancement Act" (Bill HR 5252 Amendment 987) to "establish "network neutrality" (non-tiered Internet)." In 2008, Frank voted against the "FISA Amendments Act" (Bill HR6304) which would give retroactive immunity for those involved in the NSA warrantless surveillance controversy. That same year, he co-sponsored overturning FCC approval of media consolidation (S.J.RES.28&H.J.RES.79 2008-SJR28).

Environment
In 1993, Frank co-sponsored "Safe Drinking Water Act Amendments" (H.R.3392) to regulate more contaminants under the Clean Water Act. In 2001, he co-sponsored the "National Forest Protection and Restoration Act" (H.R.1494) to "prohibiting commercial logging on Federal public lands". In 2003, he was rated 95% by the League of Conservation Voters, indicating pro-environment votes. In 2007, he co-sponsored the "Great Cats and Rare Canids Act" (H.R.1464) to "provide financial resources and to foster international cooperation for promoting conservation of rare felids & canids". In the same year, he co-sponsored the "Animal Fighting Prohibition Enforcement Act" (S.261/H.R.137) to "strengthen prohibitions against animal fighting".

Military
In 1996 Frank co-sponsored the "Federal Law Enforcement Dependents Assistance Act" (H.R.4111. Became Public Law No: 104–238.) "to provide educational assistance to the dependents of Federal law enforcement officials who are killed or disabled in the performance of their duties." In 2001 Frank co-sponsored "the MX Missile Stand-Down Act" (01-HR2718) to take fifty Peacekeeper missiles off of high-alert status as well as the Landmine Elimination and Victim Assistance Act (01-HR948). As of December 2003, Frank had an 89% rating by Peace Action, indicating a pro-peace voting record. In 2005, he co-sponsored "Rail Security Act" (S.1379/H.R.153) (05-S1379) giving higher priority to rail transportation security. In 2008, he co-sponsored the "Veterans Suicide Study Act" ( (S.2899/H.R.4204) 08-S2899) designed to study and address suicides among veterans. Frank advocated for a 25-percent reduction in the overall Military budget of the United States. "The math is compelling: if we do not make reductions approximating 25 percent of the military budget starting fairly soon, it will be impossible to continue to fund an adequate level of domestic activity ... ," wrote Frank. He claimed that such a significant reduction would have no effect on the United States' ability to defend itself. "If," he said, "beginning one year from now, we were to cut military spending by 25 percent from its projected levels, we would still be immeasurably stronger than any combination of nations with whom we might be engaged." Frank supports having fewer F-35 Joint Strike Fighter planes, but also supports a $3-billion backup engine project that the Pentagon does not want.  Frank told MSNBC's Keith Olbermann that he actually wanted to cut the entire F-35 program, but as long as military spending continued, he would fight for his district's share of it.

Online gambling
Frank has partnered with Ron Paul in support of online gambling rights. In 2006, both strongly opposed H.R. 4777, the Internet Gambling Prohibition and Enforcement Act, and H.R. 4411, the Goodlatte-Leach Internet Gambling Prohibition Act. To restore online gambling rights, in 2007 Frank sponsored H.R. 2046, the Internet Gambling Regulation and Enforcement Act.  This bill would have established licensing and regulation of online gaming sites.  It provided for age verification and protections for compulsive gamblers.  In 2008, he and Paul introduced H.R. 5767, the Payment Systems Protection Act, a bill that sought to place a moratorium on enforcement of the Unlawful Internet Gambling Enforcement Act of 2006 while the United States Treasury Department and the Federal Reserve defined "unlawful Internet gambling". As a result of these efforts, Frank (who does not gamble) has been praised by poker players and online gamblers, including many Republicans.

Relations with Israel
Frank has been a determined supporter of the State of Israel. "The Israeli government has been a wholly democratic one from the beginning," he said in a lecture to students. "It is one of the freest democracies in the world". He attributed the primary reason for Israel's long war to his belief that Palestinians are unwilling to make concessions.

In August 2009, a confidential memo written by the consul general of Israel in Boston, Nadav Tamir, was leaked to the Israeli media. In the memo, Tamir said that Israel's dealings with the Obama administration on differences over settlements were eroding US support. After Tamir was reprimanded by the Israeli government, Frank defended Tamir in a letter sent to Prime Minister Benjamin Netanyahu, in which Frank wrote: "I was sorry to learn that he (Tamir) is being criticized because of his accurate reporting of significant (negative) sentiment in the United States ... If the people who work for me did not give me the kind of straightforward, thoughtful analysis that the consul is providing, even if it wasn't the most welcome news, that failure — not the information — would cause me unhappiness."

Post-House career
In the wake of the fiscal cliff legislation at the start of 2013, Frank stated that he was interested in the interim appointment that Governor Deval Patrick was expected to make to fill John Kerry's U.S. Senate seat once the latter resigned to serve as United States Secretary of State. Frank had initially said he was not interested in the seat, but went on to change his mind, noting that "that [fiscal cliff] deal now means that February, March, and April are going to be among the most important months in American financial history". He said he would not run in the special election that would be held to fill the seat for the remainder of Kerry's term.

Frank joined the board of directors of the New York-based Signature Bank on June 17, 2015.

In 2018, Frank was featured on Sacha Baron Cohen's spoof comedy series Who Is America?, discussing the Donald Trump Access Hollywood tape and the Pizzagate conspiracy theory with Baron Cohen's alter ego Billy Wayne Ruddick Jr. Frank eventually walked out of the interview.

On December 8, 2022, Frank, despite being retired from the U.S. Congress, was present on the floor of the House of Representatives when the Respect for Marriage Act was successfully passed.

Personal life
Frank resides in a studio apartment complex in Newton, Massachusetts. His husband, Jim Ready, is a surfing enthusiast whom Frank met during a gay political fundraiser in Maine. On July 7, 2012, Frank married Ready at the Boston Marriott Newton in suburban Boston. Frank's net worth was estimated by OpenSecrets to be between $619,024 and $1,510,000. Frank chose not to participate in the Congressional pension system. He said he did not believe he'd live long enough after retirement to reap benefits over contributions; and he was convinced that he would remain single and have no beneficiary. His sister, Ann Lewis, served as a senior adviser for the Hillary Clinton 2008 presidential campaign.

Religion

On August 3, 2013, Frank expressed sympathy with the host's atheism on the television program Real Time with Bill Maher. In his biography, however, Frank states unequivocally that he is not an atheist and is uncomfortable expressing firm views on questions for which he is unable to provide an answer. Frank's agnosticism led him to resolve—if he had been appointed as interim senator—to take the oath of office on the United States Constitution, rather than the Bible. For most of his life and entire Congressional career, Frank was known as a Jew. Frank continues to identify strongly with the Jewish community and has been careful throughout his career that his agnosticism not reflect negatively on other Jews. For example, when he stopped going to temple services on the High Holy Days he was careful to remain at home and out of the public eye in order that other Jews would not be criticized using his example.

In May 2014, the American Humanist Association awarded Frank the Humanist of the Year and during his acceptance speech he spoke about his personal beliefs and the complexities of working in government. He talked primarily about the politicized case of Terri Sciavo and the public's evolving view about government intrusion into personal healthcare decisions.

Sexuality
According to Stuart Weisberg's 2009 biography Barney Frank: The Story of America's Only Left-Handed, Gay, Jewish Congressman, Frank dated women in an effort to deny his homosexuality. His last romance with a woman was a nearly two-year-long affair with Irish-American Catholic Kathleen Sullivan, a Boston School Committee member and the daughter of former New England Patriots owner Billy Sullivan, that began in 1974. When the two split up, at Frank's instigation, he admitted to her that he was gay. He was still closeted publicly. According to Frank, he "realized it was crazy" to try to have a romance with someone he cared for but was not sexually compatible with due to his homosexuality. "That was the last effort to avoid being gay," Weisberg quotes Frank as saying. Frank never again dated a woman. In 2015, in an interview with Boston Magazine, Frank said it was unfair to Sullivan to date her with him being gay.

Frank started coming out as gay to friends before he ran for Congress and came out publicly on May 30, 1987, "prompted in part by increased media interest in his private life" and the death of Stewart McKinney, "a closeted bisexual Republican representative from Connecticut". Frank told The Washington Post after McKinney's death that there was "An unfortunate debate about 'Was he or wasn't he? Didn't he or did he?' I said to myself, I don't want that to happen to me." Frank's announcement had little impact on his electoral prospects. Shortly after coming out, Frank met and began dating Herb Moses, an economist and LGBT activist; their relationship lasted for eleven years until an amicable break-up in July 1998. Moses, who was an executive at Fannie Mae from 1991 to 1998, was the first partner of an openly gay member of Congress to receive spousal benefits and the two were considered "Washington's most powerful and influential gay couple".

Electoral history

|+ : Results 1980–2010
! Year
!
! Democrat
! Votes
! %
!
! Republican
! Votes
! %
!
! Third Party
! Party
! Votes
! %
!
! Third Party
! Party
! Votes
! %
!
|-
|1980
||
| |Barney Frank
| |103,466
| |52%
|
| |Richard Jones
| |95,898
| |48%
|
|
|
|
|
|
|
|
|
|
|
|-
|1982
||
| |Barney Frank
| |151,305
| |60%
|
| |Margaret Heckler
| |82,804
| |40%
|
|
|
|
|
|
|
|
|
|
|
|-
|1984
||
| |Barney Frank
| |172,903
| |74%
|
| |Jim Forte
| |60,121
| |26%
|
|
|
|
|
|
|
|
|
|
|
|-
|1986
||
| |Barney Frank
| |134,387
| |89%
|
| |No candidate
| |
| |
|
| |Thomas DeVisscher
| |Independent
| align="right" |16,857
| align="right" |11%
|
|
|
|
|
|
|-
|1988
||
| |Barney Frank
| |169,729
| |70%
|
| |Debra Tucker
| |71,661
| |30%
|
|
|
|
|
|
|
|
|
|
|
|-
|1990
||
| |Barney Frank
| |143,473
| |66%
|
| |John Soto
| |75,454
| |34%
|
|
|
|
|
|
|
|
|
|
|
|-
|1992
||
| |Barney Frank
| |182,633
| |68%
|
| |Edward McCormick
| |70,665
| |26%
|
| |Luke Lumina
| |Independent Voters
| align="right" |13,670
| align="right" |5%
|
| |Dennis Ingalls
| |Freedom for LaRouche
| align="right" |2,797
| align="right" |1%
|
|-
|1994
||
| |Barney Frank
| |168,942
| |99%
|
| |No candidate
| |
| |
|
| |Others
| |
| align="right" |853
| align="right" |1%
|
|
|
|
|
|
|-
|1996
||
| |Barney Frank
| |183,844
| |72%
|
| |Jonathan Raymond
| |72,701
| |28%
|
|
|
|
|
|
|
|
|
|
|
|-
|1998
||
| |Barney Frank
| |148,340
| |98%
|
| |No candidate
| |
| |
|
| |Others
| |
| align="right" |2,380
| align="right" |2%
|
|
|
|
|
|
|-
|2000
||
| |Barney Frank
| |200,638
| |75%
|
| |Martin Travis
| |56,553
| |21%
|
| |David Euchner
| |Libertarian
| |10,553
| |4%
|
|
|
|
|
|
|-
|2002
||
| |Barney Frank
| |166,125
| |99%
|
| |No candidate
| |
| |
|
| |Others
| |
| |1,691
| |1%
|
|
|
|
|
|
|-
|2004
||
| |Barney Frank
| |219,260
| |78%
|
| |No candidate
| |
| |
|
| |Charles Morse
| |Independent
| |62,293
| |22%
|
|
|
|
|
|
|-
|2006
||
| |Barney Frank
| |196,513
| |98%
|
| |No candidate
| |
| |
|
| |Others
| |
| |2,730
| |1%
|
|
|
|
|
|
|-
|2008
||
| |Barney Frank
| |203,032
| |68%
|
| |	Earl Sholley
| |75,571
| |25%
|
| |Susan Allen
| |Independent
| |19,848
| |7%
|
|
|
|
|
|
|-
|2010
||
| |Barney Frank
| |126,194
| |54%
|
| |Sean Bielat
| |101,517
| |43%
|
| |Susan Allen
| |Independent
| |3,445
| |1%
|
| |Donald Jordan
| |Tax Revolt Independent
| |2,873
| |1%
|

Bibliography
 Financing Foreign Aid: A Case Study in the Budgetary Process (1962)
 Budget for a Strong America (1989)
 Speaking Frankly: What's Wrong with the Democrats and How to Fix It (1992)
 Improper Bostonians: Lesbian and Gay History from the Puritans to Playland (Foreword by Barney Frank) (2000)
 "American Immigration Law: A Case Study in the Effective Use of the Political Process" in J. D’Emilio (Ed.), Creating Change: Sexuality, Public Policy, and Civil Rights (pp 208-235). St. Martin's Press (2000)
 Positively Gay: New Approaches to Gay and Lesbian Life (Foreword by Barney Frank) (2001)
 "Dodd-Frank Wall Street Reform and Consumer Protection Act or HR 4173 (with 111th Congress and Christopher J. Dodd)" (2010)
 Crossing the Barriers: The Autobiography of Allan H. Spear (Foreword by Barney Frank) (2010)
 On the Brink: Inside the Race to Stop the Collapse of the Global Financial System (Foreword by Barney Frank) (2011)
 Time on Two Crosses: The Collected Writings of Bayard Rustin (Afterword by Barney Frank)" (2014)
 Frank: A Life in Politics from the Great Society to Same-Sex Marriage (2015)
 "Dodd-Frank Wall Street Reform and Consumer Protection Act, HR 4173 (with 111th Congress and Christopher J. Dodd)" (2017)
 "The Economic and Political Implications of the Dodd-Frank Act" in S. O’Halloran & T. Groll (Eds.), After the Crash: Financial Crises and Regulatory Responses (pp 261-280).  Columbia University Press (2019)

Filmography
 Let's Get Frank (2003) by Bart Everly, Internet Movie Database (IMDb)
 Let's Get Frank (2003) by Bart Everly, Library of Congress (LOC) Catalog
 Let's Get Frank (2003) by Bart Everly, British Film Institute (BFI) Collection
 Compared to What: The Improbable Journey of Barney Frank (2014) by Sheila Canavan and Michael Chandler, IMDb

See also 
 LGBT culture in Boston
 List of Jewish members of the United States Congress
 List of LGBT members of the United States Congress
 List of federal political scandals in the United States
 List of federal political sex scandals in the United States
 List of United States representatives expelled, censured, or reprimanded

Notes

References

Further reading

External links

 
 
 
 Filmography on IMDb (the Internet Movie Database)

|-

|-

|-

|-

|-

|-

1940 births
20th-century American politicians
21st-century American politicians
American agnostics
American people of Polish-Jewish descent
American people of Russian-Jewish descent
Bayonne High School alumni
Censured or reprimanded members of the United States House of Representatives
Democratic Party members of the United States House of Representatives from Massachusetts
Gay politicians
Harvard College alumni
Harvard Law School alumni
Jewish agnostics
Jewish American state legislators in Massachusetts
Jewish members of the United States House of Representatives
LGBT Jews
LGBT members of the United States Congress
LGBT people from New Jersey
American LGBT rights activists
LGBT rights in Massachusetts
LGBT state legislators in Massachusetts
Living people
Democratic Party members of the Massachusetts House of Representatives
Politicians from Bayonne, New Jersey